Conrad's worm snake (Ramphotyphlops conradi) is a species of snake in the family Typhlopidae. The species is endemic to Indonesia.

Etymology
The specific name, conradi, is in honor of German Captain Paul Conrad (1836 – ca. 1873).

Geographic range
R. conradi is found on the island Sulawesi (formerly known as Celebes), Indonesia.

Habitat
The preferred natural habitat of R. conradi is forest.

Description
Dorsally, R. conradi is uniform brown; ventrally, it is lighter brown. The head and the tip of the tail are white. There are 18 scales around the body at midbody. The holotype measures 17.5 cm (6.9 inches) in total length (including tail).

Behavior
R. conradi is terrestrial and fossorial.

Reproduction
R. conradi is oviparous.

References

Further reading
Hedges SB, Marion AB, Lipp KM, Marin J, Vidal N (2014). "A taxonomic framework for typhlopid snakes from the Caribbean and other regions (Reptilia, Squamata)". Caribbean Herpetology (49): 1-61. (Ramphotyphlops conradi, new combination).
Koch A (2012). Discovery, Diversity, and Distribution of the Amphibians and Reptiles of Sulawesi and its offshore islands. Frankfurt am Main: Chimaira. 374 pp. . (Typhlops conradi).
Peters W (1874). "Über neue Reptilien (Peropus, Agama, Euprepes, Lygosoma, Typhlops, Heterolepis) der herpetologischen Sammlung des Berliner zoologischen Museums ". Monatsberichte der Königlich Preussischen Akademie der Wissenschaften zu Berlin 1874: 159-164 + one plate. (Typhlops conradi, new species, pp. 162–163 + figures 1, 1a, 1b, 1c). (in German).

Ramphotyphlops
Reptiles described in 1875
Taxa named by Wilhelm Peters